Edvardas Gudavičius (6 September 1929 – 27 January 2020) was a Lithuanian historian. He was known as one of the best historians in Lithuania specializing in the early history of Grand Duchy of Lithuania. In 1953, he graduated from Kaunas Polytechnic Institute with a degree in engineering. Gudavičius started his career as a mechanic at one of the factories in Kaunas, but in 1958 moved to Vilnius. In 1962, he enrolled to Vilnius State University of Vincas Kapsukas seeking a degree in history. In 1991, he earned the title of professor. He was a full member of Lithuanian Academy of Sciences.

To the wider public he was mostly known for his work together with Alfredas Bumblauskas on the long-running TV show Būtovės slėpiniai, a talk show dedicated to topics of the history of Lithuania. Gudavičius was a frequent contributor to various reference works, including the 25-volume Visuotinė lietuvių enciklopedija. He also published works on the Statutes of Lithuania.

Dissertations
 1971 Lithuanian serfage process and its reflection in The first Statute
 1989 Lithuania in the Balts' war against German aggression in 13th century

Publications
 Žymenys ir ženklai Lietuvoje XII-XX a., Vilnius, 1981, 131 p.
 Pirmasis Lietuvos Statutas (together with Stanislovas Lazutka), Vilnius, 1983, t. 1, d. 1: Paleografinė ir tekstologinė nuorašų analizė; Vilnius, 1985, t. 1, d. 2: Dzialinskio, Lauryno ir Ališavos nuorašų faksimilės; Vilnius, 1991, t. 2, d. 1: Tekstai senąja baltarusių, lotynų ir senąja lenkų kalbomis. .
 Kryžiaus karai Pabaltijyje ir Lietuva XIII amžiuje, Vilnius, 1989, 192 p. .
 Miestų atsiradimas Lietuvoje, Vilnius, 1991, 95 p. .
 Mindaugas, Vilnius, 1998, 360 p. .
 Lietuvos istorija. Nuo seniausių laikų iki 1569 metų, Vilnius, 1999, 664 p. .
 ----, Vilnius, 2002, 116 p. .
 Lietuvos europėjimo keliais: istorinės studijos, Vilnius, 2002, 384 p. .
 Lietuvos akto promulgacijos kelias: nuo Vytauto kanceliarijos iki Lietuvos Metrikos, Vilnius, 2006, 80 p. .

Awards
Gudavičius  received these awards:
 The Commander's Grand Cross of the Order of Vytautas the Great, Lithuania, 2003
 The Commander's Cross of the Order of the Lithuanian Grand Duke Gediminas, Lithuania, 1999
Lithuanian National Prize 1998.

References

 

1929 births
2020 deaths
20th-century Lithuanian historians
21st-century Lithuanian historians
Commander's Crosses of the Order of the Lithuanian Grand Duke Gediminas
Kaunas University of Technology alumni
Academic staff of Vilnius University
Writers from Kaunas
Recipients of the Lithuanian National Prize
Vilnius University alumni
Engineers from Kaunas